The 2005 Women's Hockey Champions Trophy was the 13th edition of the Hockey Champions Trophy for women. It was held from 26 November to 4 December 2005 in Canberra, Australia.

The Netherlands won the tournament for the fourth time after defeating Australia 5–4 in the final on penalty strokes after a 0–0 draw.

Teams
The participating teams were determined by International Hockey Federation (FIH):

 (Defending champions)
 (Champions of 2004 Summer Olympics)
 (Champions of 2002 World Cup)
 (Host nation)
 (Fourth in 2004 Summer Olympics)
 (Seventh in 2004 Summer Olympics)

Squads

Head Coach: Gabriel Minadeo

Head Coach: Frank Murray

Head Coach: Kim Chang-back

Head Coach: Markus Weise

Head Coach: Marc Lammers

Head Coach: Han Jin-Soo

Umpires
Below are the 8 umpires appointed by the International Hockey Federation:

Judy Barnesby (AUS)
Ute Conen (GER)
Marelize de Klerk (RSA)
Carolina de la Fuente (ARG)
Lyn Farrell (NZL)
Kang Hyun-young (KOR)
Lisette Klaassen (NED)
Kazuko Yasueda (JPN)

Results
All times are Eastern Daylight Time (UTC+11:00)

Pool

Classification

Fifth and sixth place

Third and fourth place

Final

Awards

Statistics

Final standings

Goalscorers

References

External links
Official FIH website

Women's Hockey Champions Trophy
Hockey Champions Trophy
International women's field hockey competitions hosted by Australia
Champions Trophy
Sports competitions in Canberra
2000s in Canberra
Hockey Champions Trophy Women
Hockey Champions Trophy Women
Champions Trophy